The Nile lechwe or Mrs Gray's lechwe (Kobus megaceros) is an endangered species of antelope found in swamps and grasslands in Sudan and Ethiopia.

Description

Nile lechwes live an average of 10 to 11.5 years, and most uncommonly 19 years.

Their coats are shaggy with the hair on the cheeks particularly long in both sexes, and males may have even longer hair on their necks. Nile lechwe exhibit extreme sexual dimorphism. Females are golden-brown with white underbellies and no horns. Juveniles also have a golden-brown coat, but the color changes to dark brown in young males when they reach two to three years of age. Adult males are blackish-brown to russet with white 'hoods' over their shoulders and small white patches over their eyes.

Ecology

Nile lechwe can visually signal and vocalize to communicate with each other. They rear high in the air in front of their opponents and turn their heads to the side while displaying.  Females are quite loud, making a toad-like croaking when moving. When fighting, males duck their heads and use their horns to push against each other. If one male is significantly smaller than the other, he may move next to the larger male in a parallel position and push from there, which prevents the larger male from pushing with all his force. Known predators are humans, lions, crocodiles, cheetahs, wild dogs and leopards. They flee to water if disturbed, but females defend their offspring from smaller predators by direct attack, mainly kicking. Yearling Nile lechwes are often infected by warble flies, which can make them unhealthy and result in high mortality rates.

Nile lechwe are crepuscular, active in the early morning and late afternoon. They gather in herds of up to 50 females and one male or in smaller all-male herds. They divide themselves into three social groups: females and their new offspring, bachelor males, and mature males with territories. A males with territory sometimes allows a bachelor male into his territory to guard the region and not to copulate.

Diet

Nile lechwe feed on succulent grasses and water plants. Wild rice is thought to be a preferred food at the start of the flood season, while a larger proportion of swamp grasses are consumed when the waters recede. They have the special capability to wade in shallow waters and swim in deeper waters, and may feed on young leaves from trees and bushes, rearing up to reach this green vegetation. Nile lechwe are also found in marshy areas, where they eat aquatic plants.

Reproduction

Both sexes reach sexual maturity when they are two years old. Mating occurs throughout the year, but peaks between February and May. During mating season, young males bend their horns to the ground as if to poke the earth. Males fight in the water, their heads submerging in horn-to-horn combat, for dominance. These contests are usually short and violent. As in many other animals, the dominant male copulates with the female. A unique form of marking is seen with the start of mating. The male bends his head to the ground and urinates on his throat and cheek hair. He then rubs his dripping beard on the female's forehead and rump.

The gestation period is seven to 9 months long on average, after which a single calf is born. Females experience estrus again about a month after producing young. After its birth, the calf is kept hidden in thick vegetation for two to three weeks, where the mother nurses it. It is weaned at five to six months, and a few months later is ready to be independent and join the herd.

Habitat and distribution
Nile lechwe are endemic to Sudan and Ethiopia. In Sudan, the majority of the population occurs in the Sudd swamps, and in the Machars near the Ethiopian border in smaller numbers. In Ethiopia occurs in the southwest, in Gambela National Park, but in very less numbers possibly due to human settlement and habitat degradation. The habitat of the Nile lechwe has been severely affected by civil wars, human displacement and resettlement, firearm attacks and increased hunting. Even its seasonal movements were restricted due to large populations of cattle in and around its range. The Nile lechwe population in the Sudds, however, remained somewhat stable throughout this period.

Conservation 
The Nile lechwe has been classified under the Endangered category by the International Union for Conservation of Nature and Natural Resources (IUCN). In 1983, aerial surveys gave a total population estimate of 30,000-40,000 individuals, of which 95 percent were concentrated in the Sudds and the rest occurred between Sudan and Ethiopia. In the 1980s, the population in the Machars was estimated at 900. A population of around 150 was also reported from the swamps in Gilo River in 1967. There is also an increasing population held in captivity.
In 2007, the population of the Sudd region was estimated to be of 4,291 animals, indicating that the species has declined rapidly since the previous survey in 1983.

The Nile lechwe keep moving in and out of these areas. In Ethiopia they occur in the Gabella National Park. A study outlined priorities for both in situ and ex situ conservation of this species.

References

Marsh antelopes
Mammals of South Sudan
Mammals of Ethiopia
Nile lechwe